Butterfly also known as Butterfly Pictures was a film production company that produced and released films spanned as part of the Universal Film Manufacturing Company program from 1917 to 1918.

History
On April 28, 1917, Butterfly Pictures was announced in Motography a new brand of feature films that would be released as part of the Universal exchanges. These films would be five reels in length and would be produced at the Universal Film Manufacturing Company studios in California.

List of Butterfly films

See also
 Bluebird Photoplays

Notes

References 

Film production companies of the United States
Defunct mass media companies of the United States